Sandra Brown (born 3 February 1946) is an Australian sprinter. She competed in the women's 400 metres at the 1968 Summer Olympics.

References

External links
 

1946 births
Living people
Athletes (track and field) at the 1968 Summer Olympics
Australian female sprinters
Olympic athletes of Australia
Place of birth missing (living people)
Commonwealth Games medallists in athletics
Commonwealth Games silver medallists for Australia
Athletes (track and field) at the 1970 British Commonwealth Games
Olympic female sprinters
20th-century Australian women
21st-century Australian women
Medallists at the 1970 British Commonwealth Games